The U.S. House Committee on Natural Resources or Natural Resources Committee (often referred to as simply Resources) is a Congressional committee of the United States House of Representatives.  Originally called the Committee on Interior and Insular Affairs (1951), the name was changed to the Committee on Natural Resources in 1991.  The name was shortened to the Committee on Resources in 1995 by the new chairman, Don Young (at the same time, the committee took over the duties of the now-defunct Merchant Marine and Fisheries Committee). Following the Democratic takeover of the House of Representatives in 2006, the name of the committee was changed back to its title used between 1991 and 1995.

Jurisdiction

 Fisheries and wildlife, including research, restoration, refuges, and conservation.
 Forest reserves and national parks created from the public domain.
 Forfeiture of land grants and alien ownership, including alien ownership of mineral lands.
 Geological Survey.
 International fishing agreements.
 Interstate compacts relating to apportionment of waters for irrigation purposes.
 Irrigation and reclamation, including water supply for reclamation projects and easements of public lands for irrigation projects; and acquisition of private lands when necessary to complete irrigation projects.
 Native Americans generally, including the care and allotment of Native American lands and general and special measures relating to claims that are paid out of Native American funds.
 Insular areas of the United States generally (except those affecting the revenue and appropriations).
 Military parks and battlefields, national cemeteries administered by the Secretary of the Interior, parks within the District of Columbia, and the erection of monuments to the memory of individuals.
 Mineral land laws and claims and entries thereunder.
 Mineral resources of public lands.
 Mining interests generally.
 Mining schools and experimental stations.
 Marine affairs, including coastal zone management (except for measures relating to oil and other pollution of navigable waters).
 Oceanography.
 Petroleum conservation on public lands and conservation of the radium supply in the United States.
 Preservation of prehistoric ruins and objects of interest on the public domain.
 Public lands generally, including entry, easements, and grazing thereon.
 Relations of the United States with Native Americans and Native American tribes.
 Trans-Alaska Oil Pipeline (except ratemaking).

Members, 118th Congress

Resolutions electing members:  (Chair),  (Ranking Member),  (D),  (R),  (D)

Subcommittees

In the 111th Congress, the number of subcommittees was reduced from 5 to 4. The Subcommittees on Insular Affairs and Fisheries, Wildlife and Oceans were merged into the Subcommittee on Insular Affairs, Oceans and Wildlife. In the 112th Congress, the number was again increased to 5, adding the Subcommittee on Indian and Alaska Native Affairs.

During the committee's official reorganization for the 113th Congress, the Subcommittee on National Parks, Forests and Public Lands was renamed the Subcommittee on Public Lands and Environmental Regulation

When former Chairman Doc Hastings of Washington retired from Congress, Rob Bishop of Utah took over as the committee's new chairman at the beginning of the 114th Congress. Congressman Bishop began the process of hiring new staff and reorganized the committee's structure as his predecessors had done. The chairman eliminated the Fisheries, Wildlife, Oceans and Insular Affairs subcommittee and split its duties between the renamed Indian, Insular and Alaska Native Affairs and Water, Power and Oceans subcommittees. The chairman also created a new Subcommittee on Oversight and Investigations, keeping the total number of subcommittees at five

The chairman also transferred jurisdiction over the National Environmental Policy Act and the Endangered Species Act from the former Public Lands and Environmental Regulation and established a renamed the Subcommittee on Federal Lands.

Current subcommittees

Chairs

Historical membership rosters

117th Congress

Resolutions electing members:  (Chair),  (Ranking Member),  (D),  (R),  (D),  (D),  (D),  (Removing Gosar),  (R),  (D)

Subcommittees

116th Congress

Sources:  (Chair),  (Ranking Member),  (D),  (R),  (D),  (D),  (D),  (R),  (D)

Subcommittees

115th Congress

See also
 List of current United States House of Representatives committees

Notes

References

External links

 Committee on Natural Resources, U.S. House of Representatives (Archive)
 House Natural Resources Committee. Legislation activity and reports, Congress.gov.

Natural Resources